Pedro Ángel Strop (born June 13, 1985) is a Dominican professional baseball pitcher who is a free agent. He previously played in Major League Baseball (MLB) for the Texas Rangers, Baltimore Orioles, Cincinnati Reds, and Chicago Cubs.

Career

Colorado Rockies
Strop was a position player in the Rockies minor league system from 2002 to 2005, primarily playing shortstop. Strop moved from shortstop to pitching in 2006 due to posting poor hitting numbers. His tenure in the Rockies organization ended with his release by the Rockies on September 19, 2008.

Texas Rangers
Strop was signed by the Texas Rangers as a free agent on September 23, 2008. On August 28, 2009 Pedro made his MLB debut and struck out his first batter, the Twins star catcher Joe Mauer. Pedro Strop appeared in seven games in 2009, pitching seven innings. He gave up six hits, six runs, and four walks and had an ERA of 7.71. He struck out nine batters as well.

Strop pitched one game in June 2010, on the second against the White Sox in which he struck out one batter, and walked a batter and went back to the minors. In a trade the Texas Rangers made that sent Bengie Molina to the team, Pedro Strop was rewarded with the empty roster spot. He pitched in three games before returning to the minors when other trades were made. As of his last appearance on July 9 against Baltimore, he appeared in four games overall in the 2010 season, pitching 3.2 innings while giving up three hits and a run. He walked three batters and struck out three batters.

Baltimore Orioles
On August 31, 2011, Strop was traded from the Rangers to the Baltimore Orioles as the player to be named later in the trade for Mike Gonzalez. He finished his 2011 season going 2–0 for Baltimore with a 0.73 ERA. His pitching success continued for the majority of 2012.Through August 15 of that season, Strop achieved a 1.20 ERA primarily as a set up man to closer Jim Johnson. But over the final six weeks of the season, Strop's ERA for that period was 7.24 with an OPS of .916. He picked up a win against the Yankees pitching two innings in extra innings in the 2012 American League Division Series playoffs. After pitching well in the World Baseball Classic prior to the start of the 2013 season, Strop's late season 2012 struggles continued. In 29 games for the Orioles, Strop went 0–3 with a 7.25 ERA. Baltimore crowds began to boo the reliever and Strop said of the booing, "They [the fans] don't care about players, they care about good results." About two weeks after his comments, Strop was traded to the National League.

Chicago Cubs
On July 2, 2013, Strop was traded along with Jake Arrieta to the Cubs in exchange for Scott Feldman and Steve Clevenger. Strop primarily served in the setup role for the Cubs. In 37 more appearances with the Cubs to finish 2013, Strop had a 2–2 record and a 2.83 ERA. Overall in 2013, combined with both teams, Strop made 66 total appearances with a 2–5 record and a 4.55 ERA.

2014 season
In 2014, Strop made 65 appearances with a 2–4 record and a 2.21 ERA.

2015 season
In 2015, Strop made 76 appearances with a 2–6 record, a 2.91 ERA, and 81 strikeouts.

2016 season
In 2016, Strop made 54 appearances with a 2–2 record and a 2.85 ERA. The Cubs would eventually win the 2016 World Series, giving Strop his first World Series title.

2017 season
In 2017, Strop made 69 appearances with a 5–4 record, 65 strikeouts and a 2.83 ERA.

2018 season
In 2018, Strop had one of his best seasons as a professional. He appeared in 60 games with a 6–1 record, 57 strikeouts, a career-high 13 saves, and a 2.26 ERA, the second best of his career.

2019 season
In 2019, Strop had arguably his worst season as a professional. He appeared in only 50 games, his fewest since 2011. He finished the season with a 2–5 record, 49 strikeouts, 10 saves, and a 4.97 ERA, the worst of his career.

Cincinnati Reds
On January 30, 2020, Strop was signed by the Cincinnati Reds for a 1-year deal worth $1.8 million. Strop was designated for assignment by the Reds on August 26, 2020 and released on August 31.

Chicago Cubs (second stint)
On September 4, 2020, Strop signed a minor league contract to return to the Chicago Cubs. He joined the team at their alternate training site but did not join the big league team. He became a free agent on November 2, 2020. On February 27, 2021, Strop re-signed with the Cubs organization on a minor league contract that included a Spring Training invitation. If he makes the major league roster, he will earn $800,000 in salary. On April 12, 2021, Strop was selected to the active roster. Strop was removed from the 40-man roster on April 17 after 2 scoreless innings in 2 appearances. On May 5, 2021, Strop requested and was granted his release from the organization.

Sultanes de Monterrey
On June 24, 2021, Strop signed with the Sultanes de Monterrey of the Mexican League. He was released on March 1, 2022.

International career
In 2013, Strop pitched as a reliever in the World Baseball Classic for the championship winning Dominican Republic.

Hat
Strop is known for the unique way he wears his hat while pitching, slightly crooked to his left.

References

External links

1985 births
Living people
Asheville Tourists players
Baltimore Orioles players
Casper Rockies players
Chicago Cubs players
Cincinnati Reds players
Dominican Republic expatriate baseball players in Mexico
Dominican Republic expatriate baseball players in the United States
Frisco RoughRiders players
Gigantes del Cibao players
Leones del Escogido players
Major League Baseball pitchers
Major League Baseball players from the Dominican Republic
Modesto Nuts players
Oklahoma City RedHawks players
People from San Cristóbal, Dominican Republic
Round Rock Express players
Sultanes de Monterrey players
Texas Rangers players
Tri-City Dust Devils players
Tulsa Drillers players
World Baseball Classic players of the Dominican Republic
2013 World Baseball Classic players